Walter Simon Notheis, Jr. (February 7, 1943 – December 27, 1983), best remembered by his stage name of Walter Scott, was an American singer who fronted Bob Kuban and The In-Men, a St. Louis, Missouri-based rock 'n' roll band that had brief national popularity during the 1960s.

Career
Scott was born Walter Simon Notheis Jr. on February 7, 1943, in St. Louis, Missouri, to Catherine Marie (née Johnson; born July 22,1923- died June 27,2022) and Walter Simon Notheis Sr. (May 31, 1921–January 5, 2003). Scott found fame with Bob Kuban and The In-Men in 1966 with his lead vocals on the song "(Look Out For) The Cheater."  "The Cheater" spent eleven weeks on the Billboard Hot 100, peaking at No. 12 on 12–19 March 1966.  Scott left the group soon after to attempt a solo career. When this failed, Scott began touring with a cover band during the 1970s.  In early 1983, Scott and Kuban performed together for a television appearance, and they planned to reunite the band for their twentieth anniversary in June 1983.

Death
Scott disappeared on December 27, 1983. In April 1987, his body was found floating face-down in a cistern. He had been hog-tied and shot in the chest (Forensic Files reported that he was shot in the back). Scott's second wife, JoAnn (née Calcaterra; c. 1944–May 12, 2019), pleaded guilty to hindering the prosecution of his murder, and received a five-year sentence. She served 18 months of her sentence as a result of a plea bargain. Her lover, James H. Williams Sr., whom she married in 1986, was found guilty of two counts of capital murder involving the deaths of his previous wife, Sharon Williams (who died from what was originally thought to be an auto accident in 1983), and of Walter Scott. Police were told where to look for Scott's body by Williams' son who was incarcerated at the time and didn't get along with his father.

The case was documented on Court TV's Forensic Files (episode: The Cheater), HBO's Autopsy 3: Voices From the Grave, Secrets of the Morgue (episode: The Wells Run Dry), Oxygen's Exhumed: Killer Revealed (episode: Murders on the Edge of Town), and as part of The New Detectives: Case Studies in Forensic Science (episode: Grave Discoveries).

On September 11, 2011, James Williams died at age 72 while serving his life sentence.

Further reading 
 Priesmeyer, Scottie, The Cheaters: The Walter Scott Murder, Tula Publishing, 1997
 Spiller, Harry. Murder in the Heartland: 20 Case Files. Turner Publishing Company, 2003.
 Spiller, Harry. Sheriff: A Memoir of a Lawman from Bloody Williamson County, Illinois Turner, 1999.

References

External links 
 Bob Kuban and the In-Men Look Out For The Cheater
 
 Bob Kuban website  (Enter Site, then click on THE CHEATER for photos and recording of Walter Scott.)

1943 births
1983 deaths
1983 murders in the United States
American rock singers
Deaths by firearm in Missouri
American murder victims
Singers from Missouri
Musicians from St. Louis
People murdered in Missouri
20th-century American singers
20th-century American male singers